Humaid Saqer Al-Qasimi was a Member of the Sharjah Ruling Family Al-Qasimi (plural: Al Qawasem القواسم), one of the six ruling families of the United Arab Emirates and who ruled two of the seven emirates: Sharjah and Ras al-Khaimah.

Death 
On 1 September 2003, Sheikh Dr. Sultan bin Muhammad Al-Qasimi, Supreme Council Member and Ruler of Sharjah and Sheikh Saqr bin Mohammed al-Qasimi, Member of the Supreme Council Ruler of Ras Al-Khaimah received condolences for the death of Sheikh Humaid bin Saqr bin Humaid Al Qasimi. 

On 15 September 2003, King Fahd bin Abdul Aziz sent a cable of condolence to Sheikh Sultan bin Muhammad Al-Qasimi, Member of the Supreme Council of the United Arab Emirates, Ruler of Sharjah and his family, expressing his sadness at the death of Sheikh Humaid bin Saqr bin Humaid Al Qasimi.

References

Tribes of Arabia
Tribes of the United Arab Emirates
Middle Eastern royal families
Emirs
Emirati Sunni Muslims
Humaid Saqer
People from the Emirate of Sharjah
1955 births
2003 deaths